Čoltovo  is a village and municipality in the Rožňava District in the Košice Region of eastern Slovakia.

History
In historical records the village was first mentioned in 1291.

Geography
The village lies at an altitude of 200 metres and covers an area of 15.382 km2.
It has a population of about 480 people.

Culture
The village has a small public library, a football pitch, and a food store.

Genealogical resources

The records for genealogical research are available at the state archive "Statny Archiv in Banska Bystrica, Kosice, Slovakia"

 Roman Catholic church records (births/marriages/deaths): 1825-1896 (parish A)
 Lutheran church records (births/marriages/deaths): 1805-1908 (parish B)
 Reformated church records (births/marriages/deaths): 1792-1904 (parish B)

See also
 List of municipalities and towns in Slovakia

External links
http://www.statistics.sk/mosmis/eng/run.html
Surnames of living people in Coltovo

Villages and municipalities in Rožňava District